Satsang Vihar Purusottampur (Singur) is a holy temple of Sree Sree Thakur Anukulchandra, in Hooghly district in the Indian state of West Bengal. Reverend Aniruddha Chakraborty (Son of Reverend Ashok Chakraborty) inaugurated Satsang Vihar Purusottampur on 26 December 2004. It is near the Singur railway station 34 km from Howrah Station on the Howrah-Tarakeswar line. It is 2 km ahead of Kamarkundu junction, the crossing point of Howrah-Bardhaman chord and Howrah-Tarakeshwar lines. It is on the Durgapur Expressway/ NH 2 connecting with Maheswarpur.

References

External links

Buildings and structures in Hooghly district
Temples in West Bengal